is a Japanese name and may refer to:

Places 
 8182 Akita, a main-belt asteroid
 Akita Castle, a Nara period fortified settlement in Akita, Japan
 Akita Domain, also known as Kubota Domain, feudal domain in Edo period Japan
 Akita, Kumamoto, a former town
 Akita Prefecture, Japan
 Akita (city)
 Akita-Yake-Yama, a small stratovolcano in Akita Prefecture, Japan

People 
 Akita clan, a Japanese samurai clan of northern Honshū
 Akita (surname), for people with the surname

Art, entertainment, and media
 "", a folk song of Akita Prefecture, Japan
 Akita ranga, a Japanese school of painting

Companies
 Akita Asahi Broadcasting, a Japanese broadcast network
 Akita Bank, a Japanese regional bank
 Akita Broadcasting System, a Japanese television and radio broadcaster
 Akita Shoten, a Japanese publishing company
 Akita Television, a television station in Akita, Japan

Education
 Akita International University, a public university in Akita, Japan
 Akita Municipal Junior College of Arts and Crafts, a municipal junior college in Akita, Japan
 Akita Nutrition Junior College, a private university in Akita, Japan
 Akita Prefectural University, a Japanese prefectural university in Akita, Japan
 Akita University, a Japanese national university in Akita, Japan
 Akita University of Art, a public university in Akita, Japan
 Akita University of Nursing and Welfare, a private university in Ōdate, Japan

Cultural institutions
 Akita Museum of Art, an art museum in Akita, Japan
 Akita Museum of Modern Art, a museum in Yokote, Akita Prefecture, Japan
 Akita Omoriyama Zoo, a municipal zoo in Akita, Japan
 Akita Prefectural Museum, a prefectural museum in Akita, Japan
 Akita Senshū Museum of Art, a museum in Akita, Japan

Sports
 Akita Northern Happinets, a Japanese professional basketball
 Akita Prefectural Baseball Stadium, a baseball stadium in Akita, Japan
 Akita Prefectural Gymnasium, a stadium in Akita, Japan
 Blaublitz Akita, a Japanese association football team

Transportation
 Akita Airport, a regional/second class airport in Akita, Japan
 Akita Expressway, a national expressway in Japan
 Akita Nairiku Line, a Japanese railway line
 Akita Relay, a former limited express train service
 Akita Rinkai Railway Line, a Japanese freight-only railway line
 Akita Shinkansen, a mini-shinkansen high-speed rail line
 Akita Station, a railway station in Akita, Japan
 Akitashirakami Station, a JR East railway station in Happō, Yamamoto District, Akita Prefecture, Japan
 Port of Akita, a seaport on the Sea of Japan coast of Akita Prefecture in Akita, Japan

Other uses 
 Akita (dog), a large spitz breed of dog originating from the mountainous northern regions of Japan
 Akita Kantō, a Japanese festival celebrated from 3–7 August in Akita, Japan
 Our Lady of Akita, Marian apparitions

See also
 Mount Akita-Komagatake, an active stratovolcano